The Merrion Hall is a former Plymouth Brethren church built by Alfred Gresham Jones and completed in 1863 that was located near Merrion Square in Dublin, Ireland. It has been reconstructed and renovated and is now the Davenport Hotel, but the facade has been retained.

History
The church was built by Alfred Gresham Jones (1824–1888) for the Brethren. It was completed in 1863 at a cost of £16,000, and had a main hall capacity of 2500 to 3000 persons, plus many more standing.

The Brethren owe their origins to meetings in Dublin; the first public meeting of the group that came to worship at Merrion Hall was held at an auction room in Aungier Street in the 1820s. Until Merrion Hall was built, meetings continued in Aungier Street and at private houses in the city.

Merrion Hall was the largest Brethren Gospel Hall ever constructed. There were three completely oval galleries and a double deck preacher's platform almost identical to that of the Metropolitan Tabernacle in London. The lower hall in the basement contained a below-floor baptism pool.

The Brethren Assembly occupied the protected building until the late 1980s when it was sold to a developer and largely destroyed by a fire in 1991 and developed as the Davenport Hotel behind the original restored 1863 facade. The Italianate façade remains and is protected.

The building was used as a film location for the 1991 film Hear My Song portraying a Liverpool night club, such use being rather at odds with its original use. One of the few religious buildings mentioned in James Joyce's Ulysses is Merrion Hall.

Description

References

External links
 1863 Archiseek
 BrethrenPedia

Churches completed in 1863
Protestant churches in Dublin (city)
Plymouth Brethren
19th-century churches in the Republic of Ireland